Guðmundur Hermannsson (28 July 1925 – 15 June 2003) was an Icelandic athlete. He competed in the men's shot put at the 1968 Summer Olympics. In 1967 he was named the Icelandic Sportsperson of the Year.

References

1925 births
2003 deaths
Athletes (track and field) at the 1968 Summer Olympics
Guðmundur Hermannsson
Guðmundur Hermannsson
Guðmundur Hermannsson